Gerhard Heinzmann (born 12 October 1950 in Freiburg im Breisgau is a German philosopher and Professor of Philosophy at the Université de Lorraine.

He is known for his work on the philosophy of Henri Poincaré and founded the Archives Henri Poincaré in Nancy in 1992. He is an editor of the journal Philosophia Scientiae  and of the Publications des Archives Henri Poincaré  and a member of the Academia Europaea, the European Academy of Sciences, the Institut International de Philosophie and the Académie Internationale de Philosophie des Sciences.; He was director of the Maison des Sciences de l’Homme Lorraine from 2007 to 2014, member of the Council of the Division for Logic, Methodology and Philosophy of Science and Technology of the
International Union of History and Philosophy of Science and Technology from 2012 to 2015 and from 2020 to 2023, and he was the President of the Académie Internationale de Philosophie des Sciences (2014-2021).

References

1950 births
Living people
20th-century German philosophers
21st-century German philosophers
Writers from Freiburg im Breisgau